Hannawa Falls is a hamlet and census-designated place in St. Lawrence County, New York, United States. Its population was 1,042 as of the 2010 census. Hannawa Falls has a post office with ZIP code 13647. New York State Route 56 passes through the community.

Geography

References

Hamlets in St. Lawrence County, New York
Hamlets in New York (state)
Census-designated places in St. Lawrence County, New York
Census-designated places in New York (state)